Gee Kyung-hun (Hangul: 지경훈, ; born 5 June 1990 in Seoul) is a South Korean footballer who is currently a free agent .

He is a versatile midfielder and can play as a defensive midfielder or a central defender.

Club career
Gee spent two seasons between 2015-2017 at Hong Kong Premier League club Hong Kong Rangers.

References

External links

Eurosport profile

1990 births
Living people
Association football midfielders
South Korean footballers
South Korean expatriate footballers
Hong Kong Rangers FC players
Hong Kong Premier League players
Expatriate footballers in Hong Kong
South Korean expatriate sportspeople in Hong Kong
People from Seoul